Al-Rawi (lit. “The Narrator”) is an Egyptian animated series recounting key events in Islamic history in Classical Arabic. The story's eponymous “Narrator” is named Noureddin, and he tells his stories to the young Prince Shehab.

Synopsis
The plot centers on a man who uses science to become King Imad al-Din's vizier. Threatened by Imad al-Din's jealousy, the scientist foments war between Imad al-Din and Noureddin, a jailed former king.

Crew
Major Arab actors participated in the voice cast, including Yousuf Shaaban, Sawsan Badr, Alaa Morsy, Hassan Abdel Fattah, Khaled Saleh, and Abdel Rahman Abou Zahra. Sameh Mustafa was the director.

References

Egyptian animated television series
2014 Egyptian television series debuts
2014 Egyptian television series endings